Viśa Īrasangä (Khotanese language, in) was a Khotanese painter during the Tang dynasty. He was also a Khotanese nobleman, but sometimes he is considered to be a Tocharian originated from the north of Afghanistan. His father Viśa Baysūna was well known by his paintings during the Sui dynasty, he was referred to as "Yuchi the Elder" by Chinese people. Thereby Īrasangä was known as "Yuchi the Younger". His painting skills were often compared with Yan Liben, even the famous painter Wu Daozi was under his influence.

Īrasangä was very good at creating Buddhist and foreign exotic portraits. He came to the Chinese court in the mid 7th century. He brought a new painting style of Iranian origin and had profound influence in Chinese Buddhist art. He was credited with having helped bring the Western technique of using a line of unvarying thickness to outline figures—the "iron-wire" line—to the Buddhist temples in many Chinese cities.

Gallery

See also 
 Serindian art
 Sogdian Daēnās
 Ancient Arts of Central Asia

References 

Central Asian people
Expatriates in China
Ancient Central Asian art
Tang dynasty painters